was a Japanese entomologist, specializing in dragonflies and damselflies.

Life 
Asahina's father was a professor of pharmacology at Tokyo Imperial University. Asahina began studying Odonata as a senior school student, and took part in collecting trips to Hokkaido and southern Sakhalin with his father. He spent much of his career as Chief of the Department of Medical Entomology at the Japanese National Institute of Health, from which he retired in 1979. He was president of the Entomological Society of Japan  from 1971–1972 and president of the Japanese Society of Systematic Zoology from 1982–1983. Asahina died in 2010 at the age of 97.

Selected publications
 Asahina, Syoziro 1954: A morphological study of a relic dragonfly Epiophlebia superstes Selys: (Odonata, Anisozygoptera), 153 [Japan Society for the Promotion of Science]
 Syoziro et al. 1971: Entomological Essays to Commemorate the Retirement of K. Yasumatsu., 389 [Hokuryukan Publishing]
 The Cavernicolous cockroaches of the Ryukyu Islands, 1974
 Asahina, Syoziro 1993: A list of the odonata from Thailand, [Bangkok : Bosco Offset]

Patronyms
Burmagomphus asahinai

Sources

Further reading
 
 

Japanese entomologists
Japanese taxonomists
1913 births
2010 deaths
20th-century Japanese scientists
21st-century Japanese scientists